"Lose My Soul" is a song by TobyMac from his third studio album, Portable Sounds (2007). It features gospel artist Kirk Franklin and contemporary Christian singer Mandisa and was released in 2008 as the fifth single from the album. The song was written by McKeehan, Christopher Stevens, and Michael Ripoll. "Lose My Soul" didn't become a hit until a year after its release, peaking at No. 2 on both the US Hot Christian Songs chart and the US Hot Christian AC chart. It was ranked the thirteenth most-played song on R&Rs Year-End Top Christian CHR Songs chart in 2008.

The song was included on the 2008 compilation, WOW Hits 2009 album.

Charts

Weekly charts

Year-end charts

Decade-end charts

Certifications

Awards
The song was nominated for a Dove Award for Short Form Music Video of the Year at the 41st GMA Dove Awards held on February 18, 2010.

References

2007 singles
TobyMac songs
2007 songs
ForeFront Records singles
Songs written by TobyMac
Songs written by Christopher Stevens (musician)